The Portrait of a Military Commander is a painting by the Flemish artist Michaelina Wautier. The presence of the Wautier coat of arms on the painting has led some art historians to suggest that it depicts the artist's younger brother Pierre Wautier. It was painted some time in the 1650s, and is in a private collection.

References

Paintings by Michaelina Wautier
1650s paintings